The 1962–63 season was Dinamo București's 14th season in Divizia A. Dinamo kept the title won in the last season. In the European Cup, Dinamo entered the preliminary round, and could not pass by Galatasaray Istanbul.

Because the team was only seventh at the half of the championship, manager Angelo Niculescu was replaced by a tandem consisting of Dumitru Nicolae "Nicuşor" and Traian Ionescu.

Results

European Cup 
Preliminary round – first leg

Second leg

Squad 

Goalkeepers: Iuliu Uțu (17 / 0); Ilie Datcu (13 / 0).
Defenders: Cornel Popa (25 / 0); Ion Nunweiller (18 / 0); Dumitru Ivan (25 / 1); Ilie Constantinescu (8 / 0).
Midfielders:  Vasile Alexandru (13 / 1); Lică Nunweiller (22 / 1); Constantin Ștefan (25 / 0).
Forwards: Ion Pîrcălab (21 / 7); Constantin Frățilă (15 / 9); Iosif Varga (22 / 4); Aurel Unguroiu (20 / 3); Gheorghe Ene (19 / 7); Ion Țîrcovnicu (24 / 7); Vasile Anghel (3 / 0); Haralambie Eftimie (5 / 3); Nicolae Niculescu (2 / 0); Constantin David (12 / 1); Nicolae Selymes (8 / 2); Vasile Gergely (1 / 0).
(league appearances and goals listed in brackets)

Manager: Nicolae Dumitru / Traian Ionescu.

Transfers 

Dinamo's only transfers took place in the winter break. Vasile Gergely of Viitorul București and Nicolae Selymes from Steagul Roşu reinforced a group from which Vasile Anghel had gone to Petrolul Ploieşti and Haralambie Eftimie to Dinamo Bacau.

References 

 www.labtof.ro
 www.romaniansoccer.ro

1962
Association football clubs 1962–63 season
Dinamo
1962